Abbad Yahya; born in Palestine is a Palestinian author and novelist. He worked previously as a researcher in the ِArab Center for Research and Policy Studies. He is the editor-in-chief of Ultrasawt.

Career 
Abbad Yahya is one of the most renowned Palestinian authors in his generation. He has published four novels: Rām Allāh al-shaqrāʼ (Blonde Ramallah), al-Qism 14 (Section 14), Hātif ʻumūmī (Public telephone), and Jarīmah fī Rām Allāh  (Crime in Ramallah).

Published in 2013, Rām Allāh al-shaqrāʼ "describes the fractured Ramallah landscape and where the influx of foreigners – particularly women – serves as a trope for a range of post-Oslo dissatisfactions from social and economic divisions to failures in resistance and solidarities".

Crime in Ramallah 

In 2016 Abbad Yahya published his fourth novel, Jarīmah fī Rām Allāh  (Crime in Ramallah), which was banned by the Palestinian authorities for "indecency". Attorney General Ahmed Barak said that the novel contained "indecent texts and terms that threaten morality and public decency, which could affect the population, in particular minors". 
The novel tracks the lives of three young Palestinian men who meet in Ramallah. The youths, one of whom is gay, work together in a bar where the murder of a young woman takes place. The gay person is arrested by the authorities and interrogated. Although he is cleared of charges, the police realize that he is gay and start torturing and humiliating him for that reason. The young man moves to France in search of a place where he is accepted and not judged based on his sexual orientation.

In some parts of the novel the writer ridicules the Palestinian leaders and criticize them, portraying them as "losers". The novel is particularly criticized for it use of graphic sexual language and description.

The ban was widely criticized by Palestinian and Arab writers and journalists, who issued a statement condemning the novel ban and called on the Palestinian authorities to respect the ideals of freedom of speech and opinion.

The novel received a huge official backlash in Palestine. The head of the Palestinian Writers Union, Murad Sudani, said that Abbad Yahya's novel violates "he national and religious values of the society in order to appease the West and win prizes".

Awards 
In 2017 Abbad Yahya was the recipient of the German Pen Center "Writers in-Exile" fellowship  which is dedicated to writers who are persecuted in their home countries. Abbad Yahya was also shortlisted for the Index on Censorship Award for freedom of expression for the year 2018. Abbad Yahya was among 16 people and organizations deemed by the judges as "champions", considering their fight for freedom of expression in the world.

References

External links 
 Abbad Yahya on Twitter
 Abbad Yahya Profile on Words Without Borders
 Translated Excerpt from Crime in Ramallah
 Crime in Ramallah Review on The New York Times
 Interview with Abbad Yahya by Jemimah Steinfeld published in the Index on Censorship Magazine

Living people
Palestinian writers
Year of birth missing (living people)